Fleet Readiness Center Mid-Atlantic (FRCMA) is an American naval aviation maintenance and repair facility headquartered on board NAS Oceana. It is one of 6 main subsidiaries of the Fleet Readiness Centers. FRCMA currently has nearly 2,500 sailors, marines and civilian workers.

Services
Fleet Readiness Center Mid-Atlantic performs scheduled maintenance inspection and repair, unscheduled emergency in-service repair, structural and electronic system modifications on numerous carrier based aircraft.

The FRCMA Staff is located in Hangar 200. FRCMA also consists of seven different sites: FRCMA Det Oceana, FRCMA Det Norfolk, FRCMA Det New Orleans, FRCMA Det Washington (DC), FRCMA Det Patuxent River, Voyage Repair Team (VRT) Norfolk and Mayport, and FRCMA Aircraft Department (Oceana and Norfolk). These sites support the F/A-18, E-2, C-2, H-60, CH-46, AH-1, UH-1, EA-6B and H-53 aircraft/helicopters, ground support equipment, associated F-404, T-56, T-700, T-400, T-64 engine models, and ARLE.

Innovation
A FRCMA sailor won Athena Project DC, a yearly competition to test the most innovative, time saving and cost saving projects to help the Navy's goals.

See also
Fleet Readiness Center East
Fleet Readiness Center Northwest
Fleet Readiness Center Southeast
Fleet Readiness Center Southwest
Fleet Readiness Center West
Fleet Readiness Center Western Pacific

References

2006 establishments in North Carolina
United States naval aviation
Fleet Readiness Centers
Buildings and structures in Virginia Beach, Virginia